Charlie Chin Hsiang-lin (born May 19, 1948) is a Taiwanese actor.

Background
Born in Nanjing, China in 1948, he first had his break when he moved to Hong Kong with his family at an early age. At only 12 years of age Charlie moved to Taiwan to join Fuxing Opera School, a Peking opera school. At the age of 20 he moved back to Hong Kong to join Cathay Organisation.

His movie debut came in the film Xia Ri Chu Lian, literally translating to "The First Love In Summer". With Brigitte Lin, Joan Lin and Chin Han, the four eventually became known as the "Two Chins, Two Lins" which became iconic of 1970s romance films in China. The names became a guarantee of box office success, and so Charlie was constantly paired with one of the '2 Lins'. Charlie won 2 Golden Horse Awards and in 2000 he also presented one in Taiwan. Charlie retired from acting and began working in real estate. He lives in California with his wife Cao Chang Li and 2 sons, Gary and Kevin.

See also
 Lucky Stars

References

External links
 
 HK cinemagic entry
 Chin Discography at Smithsonian Folkways

1948 births
Living people
20th-century Taiwanese male actors
Male actors from Nanjing
Male actors from Jiangsu
Taiwanese male film actors
Taiwanese people from Jiangsu